The Lower March (al-Ṯaḡr al-ʾAdnā) was a march of al-Andalus. It included territory that is now in Portugal. 

As a borderland territory, it was home to the so-called muwalladun or indigenous converts and their descendants, some of these eventually established dynastic lordship such as the case of Ibn Marwan al-Jilliqi who ruled the Cora of Merida during the early part of the ninth century, a region with its capital in modern Merida and included the area of modern Badajoz. Several rebellions occurred in the territory, most notably caused by Umar ibn Hafsun and two of his sons refusing to recognize the Emir of Cordoba's sovereignty; even after Hafsun's death, small pockets of independent resistance persisted. It was not until a decade after Hafsun's demise that the Emir of Cordoba was able to completely quell the rebellion in the Lower March.

In the reign of ʿAbd al-Raḥmān III (912–961), the Lower March was combined with the Central March to form an enlarged march with its capital at Medinaceli in the former Central March. It retained the name of the Lower March.

References

Subdivisions of Al-Andalus
Medieval Portugal
8th-century establishments in the Umayyad Caliphate
Marches (country subdivision)